Rastyagayevo is a rural locality (a village) in Zabolotskoye Rural Settlement, Permsky District, Perm Krai, Russia. The population was 158 as of 2010. There are 9 streets.

Geography 
Rastyagayevo is located 41 km southwest of Perm (the district's administrative centre) by road. Gorshki is the nearest rural locality.

References 

Rural localities in Permsky District